The 2020–21 season was the 3rd season in the existence of Juventus U23 and the club's 3rd consecutive season in the Serie C, the third level of Italian football. Juventus U23 finished 10th in the regular season, and qualified for the first round of the promotion play-offs. They were eliminated in the second round against Pro Vercelli.

Serie C 

Juventus U23's season started on 28 September 2020, with a 2–1 victory over Pro Sesto, where Raffaele Alcibiade was sent-off in 89th minute. On 3 October, they won again with the 2–1 result over Giana Erminio. Juventus U23's first draw came on 21 October, 1–1 against AlbinoLeffe through two penalty kicks. Their first defeat was on 21 October with a 1–0 result against Pro Vercelli. Then, they won 1–0 over Lucchese, where Félix Correia given a red card in the 93rd minute, and lost 2–1 against Como. Juventus U23 started the mouth of November with three 1–1 draws: against Lecco, Livorno and a 10–men Novara. Then, they made a 3–2 victory over Pistoiese, where Elia Petrelli made a hat-trick, a 2–0 win against Grosseto and a 2–1 defeat against Olbia. Juvnetus U23 started December with two 3–1 victories in a row against Pergolettese and Pro Patria but they made in the same month, three consecutive defeats: 1–0 against Alessandria and 2–1 against Pontedera and Renate, where Filippo Delli Carri was sent-off.

Matches 

Results list Juventus U23's goal tally first.

League table

Serie C play-off

Overview 
Since Juventus U23 finished tenth in the regular season, they qualified for the first round of the promotion play-offs. On 9 May 2021, Juventus U23 won 3–1 at away the first round against Pro Patria, with goals from Filippo Ranocchia, Andrea Brighenti, Félix Correia. Juventus U23 were due to play the second round three days later, but due to the postponement of another first round match due to players testing positive for COVID-19, it was decided to postpone to 19 May all second round matches. Juventus lost 1–0 the second round against Pro Vercelli due to a goal on a diagonal shot by Rocco Costantino.

Play-offs 
Results list Juventus U23's goal tally first.

Player details 

|}

See also 
 2020–21 Juventus F.C. season
 2020–21 Juventus F.C. (women) season

Notes

References 

Juventus Next Gen seasons
Juventus U23